Albert Preston Dailey (June 16, 1939 – June 26, 1984) was an American jazz pianist.

Early life
Dailey was born in Baltimore, Maryland. His parents were Albert Preston Dailey Sr, and Gertrude Johnson Dailey. He began studying piano as a child, and his first professional appearances were with the house band of the Baltimore Royal Theater in the early 1950s. Later in the decade, he studied at Morgan State University and the Peabody Conservatory.

Later life and career
He backed Damita Jo DuBlanc on tour from 1960 to 1963, and following this briefly put together his own trio in Washington, D.C., playing at the Bohemian Caverns. In 1964, he moved to New York City, where he played with Dexter Gordon, Roy Haynes, Sarah Vaughan, Charles Mingus, and Freddie Hubbard. In 1967, he played with Woody Herman at the Monterey Jazz Festival, and played intermittently with Art Blakey's Jazz Messengers from 1968 to 1969.

In the 1970s, Dailey played with Sonny Rollins, Stan Getz, Elvin Jones, and Archie Shepp. In the 1980s, he undertook concerts at Carnegie Hall and was a member of the Upper Manhattan Jazz Society with Charlie Rouse, Benny Bailey, and Buster Williams.

Dailey died in Denver on June 26, 1984, aged 45. Dailey is survived by his 3 children, 5 grandchildren ,and 4 great-grandchildren.

Discography

As leader/co-leader

As sideman
With Ray Alexander
Cloud Patterns (Nerus Records, 1983) - live at Eddie Condon's 
With Gary Bartz
 Libra (Milestone, 1968)
With Art Blakey
 Backgammon (Roulette, 1976)
With Junior CookGood Cookin' (Muse, 1979)
With Larry CoryellComin' Home (Muse, 1984)
With Eddie "Lockjaw" DavisThe Heavy Hitter (Muse, 1979)
With Walt Dickerson
 To My Queen Revisited (SteepleChase, 1978)
With Art Farmer
 The Time and the Place: The Lost Concert (Mosaic, 1966 [2007])
With Ricky FordTenor for the Times (Muse, 1981)Future's Gold (Muse, 1983)
With Frank Foster
 Fearless Frank Foster (Prestige, 1965)
With Stan Getz
 The Best of Two Worlds (Columbia, 1975)
 The Master (Columbia, 1975 [1982])
 Poetry (Elektra/Musician, 1983)
With Bunky GreenTransformations (Vanguard, 1977)Places We've Never Been (Vanguard, 1979)
With Slide Hampton
 World of Trombones (West 54, 1979)
With Tom Harrell
 Play of Light (1982)
With Freddie Hubbard
 Backlash (Atlantic, 1966)
With Budd JohnsonOff the Wall (Argo, 1964) with Joe Newman
With Elvin Jones 
 Summit Meeting (Vanguard, 1976) with James Moody, Clark Terry, Bunky Green and Roland Prince
 The Main Force (Vanguard, 1976)
With Lee Konitz
 Figure & Spirit (Progressive, 1976)
With Oliver Nelson
 Encyclopedia of Jazz (Verve, 1966)
 The Sound of Feeling (Verve, 1966)
With Dizzy Reece
 Manhattan Project (1978)
With Charlie RouseThe Upper Manhattan Jazz Society (Enja, 1981 [1985]) with Benny Bailey
 Social Call (Uptown, 1984) with Red Rodney
With Archie Shepp
 Ballads for Trane (Denon, 1977)
With Malachi ThompsonSpirit (Delmark, 1983)
With Harold Vick
 The Caribbean Suite (RCA Victor, 1966)
 Straight Up'' (RCA Victor, 1967)

References

1939 births
1984 deaths
American jazz pianists
American male pianists
Musicians from Baltimore
SteepleChase Records artists
Muse Records artists
Columbia Records artists
20th-century American pianists
Deaths from pneumonia in Colorado
Jazz musicians from Maryland
20th-century American male musicians
American male jazz musicians